() is a town situated in Toyono District, Osaka Prefecture, Japan.

As of October 2016, the town has an estimated population of 9,971 and a density of 100 persons per km² (262/sq mi). The total area is 98.68 km² (38.1 sq mi).

Nose is noted for the "Noma Keyaki", a 1,000-year-old Keyaki tree, 25 m tall (82 ft), 11.95 m (39.2 ft) trunk circumference.

History 
People lived in Nose area in the Jomon Period, (ca. 10,000 BCE – ca. 300 BCE). Nose's ancient name is Kusaka Village. It is mentioned in the Nihon Shoki, completed in 720 CE.

In 1837, there was an important peasant revolt in Nose, in the context of the Tenpō famine (1833-1839), some months after Ōshio Heihachirō’s riot.

Geography 
Nose is surrounded in all directions, including Mount Miyama (791m) and Mount Kenpi (784m). Besides, many streams, Yamabe, Hitokuraohroji, Noma and Tajiri Rivers flow in the Inagawa River basin, and Katsura River also flow in the town.

Climate
Nose has a Humid subtropical climate (Köppen Cfa) characterized by warm summers and cool winters with light to no snowfall.

Demographics
Per Japanese census data, the population of Nose in 2020 is 9,079 people. Nose has been conducting censuses since 1920.

Transportation

Rails 
No train stations locate at Nose. The nearest station is Yamashita Station, Kawanishi, Hyōgo.

Roads 

 National highway
 National Route 173
 National Route 477
 Prefectural road
 Osaka Prefectural Route 4
 Osaka Prefectural Route 54

References

External links

Nose official website 
Nose Town Tourism & Local Products

Towns in Osaka Prefecture